The MGM-52 Lance was a mobile field artillery tactical surface-to-surface missile (tactical ballistic missile) system used to provide both nuclear and conventional fire support to the United States Army. The missile's warhead was developed at Lawrence Livermore National Laboratory. It was replaced by MGM-140 ATACMS, which was initially intended to likewise have a nuclear capability during the Cold War.

Deployment
The first Lance missiles were deployed in 1972, replacing (together with the US-Navy's nuclear-tipped RIM-2D and RIM-8E/B/D) the earlier Honest John rocket and Sergeant SRBM ballistic missile, greatly reducing the weight and bulk of the system, while improving both accuracy and mobility.

A Lance battery (two fire units) consisted of two M752 launchers (one missile each) and two M688 auxiliary vehicles (two missiles each), for a total six missiles; the firing rate per unit was approximately three missiles per hour. The launch vehicles were also able to carry and launch the MGR-1 Honest John with a special kit for operational war-zone mission-dependent flexibility.

The missile's engine had an unusual arrangement, with a small sustainer engine mounted within a toroidal boost engine.

Payload
The W70-3 nuclear warhead version was one of the first warheads to be battlefield-ready with an "enhanced radiation" (neutron bomb) capability. Conventional munitions included single conventional shaped-charge warhead for penetrating hard targets and for bunker busting or a cluster configuration containing 836 M74 bomblets for anti-personnel and anti-materiel uses. The original design considered a chemical weapon warhead option, but this development was cancelled in 1970.

Deactivation
The Lance missile was removed from service following the end of the Cold War and was partially replaced in the conventional role by the MGM-140 ATACMS.

Operators

Former operators
 United States Army
1st Battalion, 12th Field Artillery Regiment (1973–1992) Fort Sill, Oklahoma
1st Battalion, 32nd Field Artillery Regiment (1975–1991) Hanau, Germany
6th Battalion, 33rd Field Artillery Regiment (1975–1987); redesignated as 6th Battalion, 32nd Field Artillery Regiment (1987–1991) Fort Sill (One battery was forward deployed to South Korea)
2nd Battalion, 42nd Field Artillery Regiment (1974–1987); redesignated as 4th Battalion, 12th Field Artillery Regiment (1987–1991) Crailsheim, Germany
3rd Battalion, 79th Field Artillery Regiment (1974–1986); redesignated as 2nd Battalion, 32nd Field Artillery Regiment (1986–1991) Giessen, Germany
1st Battalion, 80th Field Artillery Regiment (1974–1987); redesignated as 3rd Battalion, 12th Field Artillery Regiment (1987–1991) Aschaffenburg, Germany
1st Battalion, 333rd Field Artillery Regiment (1973–1986); redesignated as 3rd Battalion, 32nd Field Artillery Regiment (1986–?) Wiesbaden, Germany
2nd Battalion, 377th Field Artillery Regiment (1974–1987); redesignated as 2nd Battalion, 12th Field Artillery Regiment (1987–1992) Herzogenaurach, Germany

 British Army
50 Missile Regiment Royal Artillery (disbanded and retired weapons in 1993)

 Israeli Defence Forces

 Royal Netherlands Army
129th Artillery Battalion (1979–1992)

 Belgian Land Component
3rd Artillery Battalion (1977-1992)

 Italian Army
 3rd Missile Brigade "Aquileia" (up to 1991, then from 1992 to 2001, 3rd Missile Rgt)

 German Army
150th Rocket Artillery Battalion
250th Rocket Artillery Battalion
350th Rocket Artillery Battalion
650th Rocket Artillery Battalion

See also
 Sea Lance, a similarly named, but unrelated submarine-launched missile.
 List of missiles
 M-numbers

References

External links

Video of Lance missiles being launched by British Army in 1992 – #1
Video of British Army Lance launches in 1992 – #2
Video of British Army Lance launches in 1992 – #3
Redstone Arsenal History – Lance
Herzobase.org – Lance Missile base in Germany
Designation Systems Article
Brookings Institution photos and data

Cold War nuclear missiles of the United States
Short-range ballistic missiles
Cold War missiles of the United States
MGM-052
Military equipment introduced in the 1970s